Ellemobil was a car type constructed by the Danish inventor Jacob Ellehammer and built between 1909 and 1913. The car was 2-seater with 3-cylinder air-cooled  engine. Jacob Ellehammer became famous mostly as an aviation pioneer.

External links
 http://www.gtue-oldtimerservice.de

Vehicles of Denmark